The Z.Vex Fuzz Factory is a fuzz pedal made by the American inventor and musician Zachary Vex of the Z.Vex Effects company. 
The Fuzz Factory is based on, yet vastly expands the tonal palette of, classic fuzz-tone designs from the 1960s. Invented in the mid-1990s, the pedals are mostly handbuilt and painted in Minnesota, United States, with a budget line being manufactured in Taiwan.

Custom Finishes 

Each unit is handpainted, and while there is a stock design that adorns most models of the pedal, there have been several variations released in limited quantity, including sparkle finishes, kanji finishes (writing and labelling of controls are in Japanese kanji characters), Korean finishes (all controls labelled in Korean), and so on. These limited runs of custom paintjobs underscore the handmade, one-of-a-kind nature of the devices. From the earliest incarnations of the device in the mid-1990s, Jason Myrold painted all Fuzz Factories leaving the Z.Vex shop. Briefly during the mid-2000s the artist Laura Bennett assumed painting duties.

Vexter Series Fuzz Factory

In December 2004, Z.Vex released a new model of the Fuzz Factory, called the Vexter Series Fuzz Factory. The Vexter series differs from the Handpainted version in that it has a silkscreened enclosure and a shorter warranty period. This effectively lowers the price point, and makes both production easier for Z.Vex and allows the effect to become more accessible to musicians. The Vexter Fuzz Factory contains the same circuit as the original Fuzz Factory pedals, with the inclusion of modern touches such as an indicator LED and DC power jack for powering the fuzz with an adapter. As of August 2006, Vexter series Z.Vex pedal subassemblies are completed in Taiwan, but a large portion is still done in Minnesota.

Variations and Followers 

Soon after the rise in popularity of the original Fuzz Factory, the Fuzz Probe was introduced. This version kept most of the circuitry the same, but added a voltage-sensitive copper plate affixed to, and extending downward from the bottom of the unit. This copper plate, hardwired to the 'Stab' control on the pedal, allowed for real time control by use of one's foot or hand. By varying the distance from appendage to plate, the self-oscillation effects of the Fuzz Factory (Probe) circuit could be tempered and played musically, similar to a Theremin.

Several newer effects makers, such as Death By Audio, have introduced products which exploit the feedback-loop characteristics in the same way as the Fuzz Factory. Japanese manufacturer Zoom released a self-oscillating/feedback loop-derived fuzz design called the Ultra-Fuzz, which some have likened to be a "poor man's" Fuzz Factory. In addition, circuit bending is now a commonplace technique among experimental electronic musicians, with the principles employed in the Fuzz Factory being extended to include almost any electronic device.

Muse frontman Matt Bellamy is perhaps the best known user of the Fuzz Factory. The feedback heard at the beginning of Plug In Baby is a Fuzz Factory oscillating before Bellamy launches into the song's iconic riff. Bellamy also owns several guitars with a built-in Fuzz Factory which he came up with the concept and was built by Hugh Manson of Manson Guitars. The first such guitar was popularly known by fans as the "Silver Manson" but now named "Manson Delorean". It was retired after the Absolution era, but Bellamy still uses the Fuzz Factory in the studio and on stage.

Since the Fuzz factory is very expensive, but the electronic circuit rather simple – with the PCB board containing only 13 parts – it's a popular project in the D.I.Y Scene.

Fuzz Factory users
Notable musicians who have used the Fuzz Factory include:

 Matthew Bellamy of Muse
 Vigilante Carlstroem of The Hives
 Dan Boeckner of Wolf Parade
 Stephen Carpenter of Deftones
 Buckethead
 Greg Camp formerly of Smash Mouth, currently of Defektor
 Lloyd Cole
 Sharin Foo of The Raveonettes
 Rivers Cuomo of Weezer
 Steven Drozd and Wayne Coyne of The Flaming Lips
 Liam Finn
 Robert Fripp
 John Frusciante of Red Hot Chili Peppers
 Billy Gibbons of ZZ Top
 Michio Kurihara of Ghost and Boris
 Scott Henderson
 Jack L. Stroem
 Mark Hoppus of +44
 Daniel Johns of Silverchair
 Stephen Malkmus of Pavement and The Jicks
 J Mascis of Dinosaur Jr.
 Trent Reznor of Nine Inch Nails
 David Sylvian
 Nels Cline of Wilco
 David Torn
 Annie Clark of St. Vincent
 Tim Wheeler of Ash
 Jack White of The White Stripes and The Raconteurs
 Dustin Kensrue of Thrice
 Tegan and Sara
 Alan Sparhawk of Low
 Drew Goddard of Karnivool

External links
Zachary Vex's page on the Fuzz Factory, including a demonstration video.
Harmony Central's review page on the Fuzz Factory
Effects units